Nathan Vella (born 10 February 1990) is a New Zealand rugby union player who currently plays as a hooker for  in New Zealand's domestic Mitre 10 Cup.

Youth career

Born and raised in Auckland, Vella attended Auckland Grammar School in the city and played first XV rugby with them for 3 years, captaining the side in 2008.   During this time, he made his way through the age group levels with his local provincial side, .

Senior career

Vella started his senior career with his local side, Auckland, making 14 appearances for them across 3 seasons from 2011 to 2013.   He then moved to the UK to try his luck, initially with London Welsh who he helped win promotion to the English Premiership in 2014.   Latterly he had a short stint with RFU Championship side, the Bedford Blues before returning to New Zealand in 2016.

He made 9 appearances, 7 of which were as a replacement for regular starter Ben Funnell and scored an impressive 4 tries which helped Canterbury lift that year's Mitre 10 Cup Premiership, their 8th success in 9 seasons.

Super Rugby
Vella made his super rugby debit for the Crusaders as in 2016 and in 2018 played for the Hurricanes against the Crusaders. Then in 2019 Vella played for Japanese super side the Sunwolves. When third choice Highlanders hooker Ricky Jackson suffered an ankle injury before the 2020 season, Vella was bought into the side.

References

1990 births
Living people
New Zealand rugby union players
Rugby union hookers
Rugby union players from Auckland
Auckland rugby union players
Canterbury rugby union players
Bay of Plenty rugby union players
London Welsh RFC players
Bedford Blues players
People educated at Auckland Grammar School
New Zealand expatriate rugby union players
New Zealand expatriate sportspeople in England
Expatriate rugby union players in England
New Zealand people of English descent
Sunwolves players
Hurricanes (rugby union) players
Coca-Cola Red Sparks players
Highlanders (rugby union) players
Crusaders (rugby union) players